Lachenalia is a genus of bulbous perennial plants in the family Asparagaceae, subfamily Scilloideae, which are usually found in Namibia and South Africa. Most of them have a dormancy period, but new roots will always grow every year.

Lachenalia is named after the Swiss botanist Werner de Lachenal (1736-1800). Species are sometimes known as Cape cowslip, though they are not even somewhat related to the true cowslip Primula veris.

Species
, the Plants of the World Online accepted 136 species:
Lachenalia alba W.F.Barker ex G.D.Duncan
Lachenalia algoensis Schönland
Lachenalia aloides (L.f.) Engl.
Lachenalia ameliae W.F.Barker
Lachenalia angelica W.F.Barker
Lachenalia anguinea Sweet
Lachenalia arbuthnotiae W.F.Barker
Lachenalia attenuata W.F.Barker ex G.D.Duncan
Lachenalia aurioliae G.D.Duncan
Lachenalia bachmannii Baker
Lachenalia barkeriana U.Müll.-Doblies
Lachenalia bolusii W.F.Barker
Lachenalia bowkeri Baker
Lachenalia buchubergensis Dinter
Lachenalia bulbifera (Cirillo) Engl.
Lachenalia campanulata Baker
Lachenalia capensis W.F.Barker
Lachenalia carnosa Baker
Lachenalia cernua G.D.Duncan
Lachenalia comptonii W.F.Barker
Lachenalia concordiana Schltr. ex W.F.Barker
Lachenalia congesta W.F.Barker
Lachenalia contaminata Aiton
Lachenalia convallarioides Baker
Lachenalia corymbosa (L.) J.C.Manning & Goldblatt
Lachenalia dasybotrya Diels
Lachenalia dehoopensis W.F.Barker
Lachenalia doleritica G.D.Duncan
Lachenalia duncanii W.F.Barker
Lachenalia elegans W.F.Barker
Lachenalia ensifolia (Thunb.) J.C.Manning & Goldblatt
Lachenalia fistulosa Baker
Lachenalia flava Andrews
Lachenalia framesii W.F.Barker
Lachenalia giessii W.F.Barker
Lachenalia glaucophylla W.F.Barker
Lachenalia haarlemensis Fourc.
Lachenalia hirta (Thunb.) Thunb.
Lachenalia inconspicua G.D.Duncan
Lachenalia isopetala Jacq.
 
Lachenalia juncifolia Baker
Lachenalia karooica W.F.Barker ex G.D.Duncan
Lachenalia klinghardtiana Dinter
Lachenalia kliprandensis W.F.Barker
Lachenalia lactosa G.D.Duncan
Lachenalia latimerae W.F.Barker
Lachenalia leipoldtii G.D.Duncan
Lachenalia leomontana W.F.Barker
Lachenalia liliiflora Jacq.
Lachenalia longibracteata E.Phillips
Lachenalia longituba (A.M.van der Merwe) J.C.Manning & Goldblatt
Lachenalia lutea G.D.Duncan
Lachenalia luteola Jacq.
Lachenalia lutzeyeri G.D.Duncan
Lachenalia macgregoriorum W.F.Barker
Lachenalia margaretae W.F.Barker
Lachenalia marginata W.F.Barker
Lachenalia marlothii W.F.Barker ex G.D.Duncan
Lachenalia martiniae W.F.Barker
Lachenalia mathewsii W.F.Barker
Lachenalia maughanii (W.F.Barker) J.C.Manning & Goldblatt
Lachenalia maximiliani Schltr. ex W.F.Barker
Lachenalia mediana Jacq.
Lachenalia minima W.F.Barker
Lachenalia moniliformis W.F.Barker
Lachenalia montana Schltr. ex W.F.Barker
Lachenalia multifolia W.F.Barker
Lachenalia mutabilis Lodd. ex Sweet
Lachenalia namaquensis W.F.Barker
Lachenalia namibiensis W.F.Barker
Lachenalia nardousbergensis G.D.Duncan
Lachenalia neilii W.F.Barker ex G.D.Duncan
Lachenalia nervosa Ker Gawl.
Lachenalia nutans G.D.Duncan
Lachenalia obscura Schltr. ex G.D.Duncan
Lachenalia orchioides (L.) Aiton
Lachenalia orthopetala Jacq.
Lachenalia pallida Aiton
Lachenalia patula Jacq.
Lachenalia paucifolia (W.F.Barker) J.C.Manning & Goldblatt
Lachenalia pearsonii (R.Glover) W.F.Barker
Lachenalia peersii Marloth ex W.F.Barker
Lachenalia perryae G.D.Duncan
Lachenalia physocaulos W.F.Barker
Lachenalia polyphylla Baker
Lachenalia polypodantha Schltr. ex W.F.Barker
Lachenalia punctata Jacq.
Lachenalia purpureocaerulea Jacq.
Lachenalia pusilla Jacq.
Lachenalia quadricolor Jacq.
Lachenalia reflexa Thunb.
Lachenalia rosea Andrews
Lachenalia salteri W.F.Barker
Lachenalia sargeantii W.F.Barker
Lachenalia schelpei W.F.Barker
Lachenalia schlechteri Baker
Lachenalia sessiliflora Andrews
Lachenalia splendida Diels
Lachenalia stayneri W.F.Barker
Lachenalia thomasiae W.F.Barker ex G.D.Duncan
Lachenalia trichophylla Baker
Lachenalia undulata Masson ex Baker
Lachenalia unifolia Jacq.
Lachenalia valeriae G.D.Duncan
Lachenalia variegata W.F.Barker
Lachenalia ventricosa Schltr. ex W.F.Barker
Lachenalia verticillata W.F.Barker
Lachenalia violacea Jacq.
Lachenalia viridiflora W.F.Barker
Lachenalia whitehillensis W.F.Barker
Lachenalia wrightii Baker
Lachenalia xerophila Schltr. ex G.D.Duncan
Lachenalia youngii Baker in W.H.Harvey & auct. suc. (eds.)
Lachenalia zebrina W.F.Barker
Lachenalia zeyheri Baker

In addition, Lachenalia nordenstamii W.F.Barker was listed as "threatened" in the 2006 IUCN Red List, but  the name was not accepted by the World Checklist of Selected Plant Families.

Cultivation
Several species are cultivated as garden plants. The following have gained the Royal Horticultural Society’s Award of Garden Merit.
 
Lachenalia ‘Rupert’ 
Lachenalia bulbifera ‘George’ 
Lachenalia contaminata 
Lachenalia corymbosa 
Lachenalia flava 
Lachenalia pustulata 
Lachenalia quadricolor 
Lachenalia vanzyliae 
Lachenalia viridiflora

References

Bibliography

External links

Pacific Bulb Society: Lachenalia

 
Asparagaceae genera